Marie Elizabeth Harf (born June 15, 1981) is a liberal political commentator for the Fox News Channel and former deputy campaign manager for policy and communications for the Rep. Seth Moulton (D-Mass.) presidential campaign.  She served as the Senior advisor of Strategic Communications to U.S. Secretary of State John Kerry at the United States Department of State, leading the Iran nuclear negotiations communications strategy. Harf also was Acting Spokesperson and Deputy Spokesperson of the State Department.

Early life
Harf is the daughter of Jane Ax Harf of Granville, Ohio, and James E. Harf of St. Louis, Missouri, and is a native of Granville, Ohio. She graduated from Granville High School in 1999.

She graduated from Indiana University Bloomington with a BA in Political Science with concentrations in Jewish Studies and Russian and Eastern European Studies, and then received her master's degree in Foreign Affairs from the University of Virginia, where her thesis examined the prospects for continued regime stability in Saudi Arabia.

Career
Harf began her career at the Directorate of Intelligence at the CIA as an analyst focusing on Middle Eastern leadership issues.  She later became the media spokesperson of the CIA. During the 2012 presidential election, she reportedly helped craft U.S. President Barack Obama's national security and communications strategy, and also served as campaign spokesperson on national security issues. In June 2013, Harf was appointed Deputy Spokesperson for the Department of State, where she served as deputy under Jen Psaki.

Harf attracted controversy for an interview she gave on Hardball with Chris Matthews on February 16, 2015 following the release the day before of a video by the Islamic State of Iraq and Syria (ISIS) showing the beheading of 21 Egyptian Coptic Christians in Libya. In response to questioning from Matthews on the U.S.'s strategy toward ISIS, Harf said, "We cannot kill our way out of this war. We need in the medium to longer term to go after the root causes that leads people to join these groups, whether it's a lack of opportunity for jobs, whether ..." Her critics ridiculed her on social media with the hashtag "#JobsForISIS", which became a top 10 trending topic on U.S. Twitter.

In April 2015, Bloomberg News reported that retiring U.S. Navy Rear Admiral John Kirby would soon be appointed Spokesperson for the Department of State, replacing Acting Spokesperson Marie Harf, who had also interviewed for the position. In 2013, Kirby had also beaten out Harf for the spokesperson position at the U.S. Department of Defense under Secretary of Defense Chuck Hagel,

Harf served as Acting Spokesperson until May 13, 2015, and on June 1, 2015, she began a new role as Senior Advisor for Strategic Communications to Secretary of State John Kerry, continuing her work leading the Iran nuclear negotiations communications strategy. In January 2017 she became a political commentator for the Fox News Channel. In May 2019, Harf left Fox News to work for Rep. Seth Moulton's failed Presidential Campaign. After Rep. Moulton suspended his campaign, she became the Executive Director of the progressive Serve America PAC, founded by Seth Moulton. She returned as a Fox News Contributor in September 2019.

Personal life
Harf married Joshua Lucas on April 14, 2012.

References

External links

1981 births
Living people
American public relations people
Barack Obama 2012 presidential campaign
Indiana University alumni
People from Granville, Ohio
Analysts of the Central Intelligence Agency
United States Department of State officials
University of Virginia alumni
United States Department of State spokespeople
Fox News people